William Henry Mylrea (January 1, 1853 – September 11, 1916) was an American lawyer.

Born in Rochester, New York, he moved to what is now Wisconsin Dells, Wisconsin as a child. After going to Lawrence College, Myrlea was admitted to the Wisconsin bar. He then moved to Wausau, Wisconsin to practice law and to work in the insurance, lumber, real estate business. He served as Marathon County, Wisconsin District Attorney in 1886. He served as Wisconsin Attorney General from 1895 to 1899 as a Republican. He died at his home in Wausau after two years of illness.

References 

Politicians from Rochester, New York
Politicians from Wausau, Wisconsin
Lawrence University alumni
Wisconsin Republicans
Wisconsin Attorneys General
District attorneys in Wisconsin
People from Wisconsin Dells, Wisconsin
1853 births
1916 deaths
19th-century American politicians
Lawyers from Rochester, New York
19th-century American lawyers